Owing to its ethnic and cultural diversity, religion in Arunachal Pradesh has been a spot for the syncretism of different traditional religions. Much of the native Tani populations follow an indigenous belief which has been systematised under the banner  "Donyi-Polo" (Sun-Moon) since the spread of Christianity in the region by Christian missionaries in the second half of the 20th century. The province is also home to a substantial Tibetan Buddhist population in the north and northwest who follow Tibetan Buddhism, of ethnic groups who subscribe to Hinduism, and other religious populations. Christianity is followed by over 30.26% of the population, mostly by natives.

Statistics

Hindu influence on Donyi Poloism
Ever since the founding of the Donyi Polo religion by Daadi Botté Talom Rukbo, the indigenous religious movement has been heavily influenced by Hinduism. Donyi Poloism, along with other ancient religions, such as Hinduism, share a common belief on nature and the philosophy of maintaining the balance of nature. There was a fear among the followers in the early days of the movement that the religion would be incorporated into Hinduism as a result. This was refuted by Daadi Botté Talom Rukbo himself in a religious conference  when he established similarities between Donyi Polo and Bön, ancient Maya religion, Egyptian Ra Sun Worship, Tengri Worship & Japanese Shinto religion; and as such, all the world’s ancient religions share a singular philosophy and are a part of a world community of nature worshippers and thus, asserted the need for a more independent approach. A prominent Donyi Polo worship place in Aalo town is reminiscent of a Hindu temple. External influence upon the local indigenous religious traditions has been met with increasing opposition and severity among the Tani intellectuals.

However a large number of the Donyi Polo followers still identify themselves as Hindu in the Census because the poll does not recognise the indigenous religion and thus, avoid selecting the "others" option.

Hinduism
In late 1970s, there was a discovery of Shiv ling in Ziro in Lower Subansiri district in Arunachal Pradesh.

Buddhism 
Buddhism arrived in Arunachal Pradesh in 8th century CE from Tibet.

Christianity 

Christians comprise about one-third of the total population of Arunachal Pradesh. Most of these are Roman Catholics, while some are Baptists. There has been a rise in the Christian population of the state. Some say that this is due to conversions, while experts attribute this to the effect of migration on the small population of the state.

See also 
 Golden Pagoda, Namsai
 Tawang Monastery
 Si-Donyi Festival
 Rangfrah, revivalist movement of Tangsa traditional spirituality
 Buddhism in Himachal Pradesh

References

 
Religion in India by state or union territory